Rick Clunn (born July 24, 1946) is a professional bass fisherman.

Biography 
Clunn has won the Bassmaster Classic tournament four times, in 1976, 1977, 1984, and 1990, tying him with Kevin Van Dam for the most Bassmaster Classic wins. Clunn is considered one of the best anglers of all time, having placed in the top 10 in over 100 tournaments, and winning seventeen of those. In 1988, he was voted Angler of the Year by the B.A.S.S. organization. In 2001, he was inducted into the Bass Fishing Hall of Fame.

On February 12, 2019, Clunn beat his own record as the oldest angler to win a Bassmaster Elite Series event at 72 years old. On the final day of competition on the St. Johns River, Clunn caught two 9-plus pound largemouths to solidify his victory.

He first set the record on March 20, 2016 also on the St. Johns River. Clunn, won the tournament with a four-day total weight of 81 pounds, 15 ounces. With that win, he became the oldest person to ever win a Bassmaster tournament at 69, until breaking that record again in 2019. Clunn gained his victory with a near-record one day catch of 31 pounds, 7 ounces during Saturday's semifinal round.

Clunn has appeared on Comedy Central's The Daily Show, as well as in numerous fishing shows and bass magazines.

Awards
 Won Bass U.S. Open Bass fishing tournament at Lake Mead, Nevada in 1983 and 1986.
  1976, 1977, 1984, and 1990 Bassmasters Classic Champion (fished 32 total Bassmasters Classic Championship tournaments).
  1988 B.A.S.S. Angler of the Year.
  28 consecutive years qualifying for the Bassmasters Classic Championship.
  1985 Redman All-American Champion.
  1983, 1986 U.S. Open Champion.
  15 B.A.S.S. National Championship wins.
  FLW Champion Ross Barnett, Mississippi Feb. 1997.
  FLW Champion Beaver Lake, Arkansas April 2000.
  FLW Champion Pickwick, Alabama Lake June 2000.
  2001 B.A.S.S. Mega-Bucks Champion.
  All-Time leading money winner FLW Tour, over $700,000.
  Inducted Bass Fishing Hall of Fame 2001.
  Inducted Freshwater Fishing Hall of Fame 2001.
  2002 B.A.S.S. Central Open Sam Rayburn Champion.
  Won ESPN's Greatest Angler Debate in 2005.
  Won more than $3.25 million in BASS tournaments
  US man of the year
  Inducted into the Missouri Sports Hall of Fame, January 2017.

See also
 List of American fishers

References

External links 
 Rick Clunn's YouTube channel
 Rick Clunn's Facebook page
 Fishing stats at bassfan.com
 Angler Profile
 Top_Bass_Player

American fishers
Living people
1946 births
People from Ava, Missouri
Sportspeople from Harris County, Texas